Ebelle "Eugène" Ferdinand Ekéké  (born 30 May 1960) is a Cameroonian former professional footballer who played as a forward. He appeared for the Cameroon national team at the 1990 World Cup in Italy.  He famously scored to give Cameroon the lead against England in the quarter-finals, before eventually losing 3–2.

Born in Bonabéri, Cameroon, Ekéké played most of his club football in France, at RC Paris from 1982 to 1986, during which period he played for Cameroon in the 1984 Olympic Football competition, alongside many of the team who would later play so well at the World Cup six years later. Ekéké spent the 1986–87 season at K.S.K. Beveren, in Belgium, before returning to France to Quimper for a couple of seasons, before his move to Valenciennes FC, for whom he was playing when he was called up for the 1990 World Cup.

After he retired from playing, Ekéké established a football academy in Douala and was appointed president of l’Union Camerounais des clubs amateurs de football (UCCAF).
Ekéké is now based in Douala, occasionally commenting on matters regarding the Indomitable Lions in the local media.

References

External links

1960 births
Living people
People from Littoral Region (Cameroon)
Cameroonian footballers
Association football forwards
Cameroon international footballers
Olympic footballers of Cameroon
Footballers at the 1984 Summer Olympics
1990 FIFA World Cup players
1988 African Cup of Nations players
1990 African Cup of Nations players
1992 African Cup of Nations players
Africa Cup of Nations-winning players
Racing Club de France Football players
K.S.K. Beveren players
Quimper Kerfeunteun F.C. players
Valenciennes FC players
Ligue 1 players
Ligue 2 players
Belgian Pro League players
Cameroonian expatriate footballers
Cameroonian expatriate sportspeople in France
Expatriate footballers in France
Cameroonian expatriate sportspeople in Belgium
Expatriate footballers in Belgium